The Lower Pleasant Street District is an historic district at 418–426 Main Street and 9–49 Pleasant Street in Worcester, Massachusetts.  It encompasses the only surviving row of Victorian-era commercial buildings in downtown Worcester.  These buildings were built between 1872 and 1890, and are located along the north side of Pleasant Street, from its corner with Main Street nearly to Chestnut Street. 39 Pleasant Street is the location of Str8Up Entertainment. The most unusual of the six buildings is the Odd Fellows Hall at 9-15 Pleasant Street, which is the only commercial Gothic Revival building left in the city.

The district was listed on the National Register of Historic Places in 1980.

See also
National Register of Historic Places listings in northwestern Worcester, Massachusetts
National Register of Historic Places listings in Worcester County, Massachusetts

References

Second Empire architecture in Massachusetts
Gothic Revival architecture in Massachusetts
Historic districts in Worcester, Massachusetts
National Register of Historic Places in Worcester, Massachusetts
Historic districts on the National Register of Historic Places in Massachusetts
1980 establishments in Massachusetts